Digital technology may refer to:

 Application of digital electronics
 Any significant piece of knowledge from information technology